Corwin Manufacturing Company (formerly Vaughn Machine Company) was a pioneer brass era American automobile company, built in Peabody, Massachusetts.

During 1905 and 1906, Corwin produced the Gas-au-lec, a five-place side-entrance tourer with a copper-jacketed four-cylinder four-cycle gasoline (petrol) engine of 40-45 hp (30-34 kW). The company's ads claimed it lacked starting crank, "change speed gears", clutch, cams, valve gear, tappets, and complications, thanks to  electromagnetically operated inlet valves.

Notes

Sources
Clymer, Floyd. Treasury of Early American Automobiles, 1877-1925. New York: Bonanza Books, 1950.
David Burgess Wise, The New Illustrated Encyclopedia of Automobiles

See also
List of automobile manufacturers
List of defunct automobile manufacturers

Brass Era vehicles
Defunct motor vehicle manufacturers of the United States
1900s cars
Companies based in Peabody, Massachusetts
Motor vehicle manufacturers based in Massachusetts
Defunct manufacturing companies based in Massachusetts